Jonathan Douglas Quick (born January 21, 1986) is an American professional ice hockey goaltender for the Vegas Golden Knights of the National Hockey League (NHL). Quick was selected in the third round, 72nd overall, by the Los Angeles Kings at the 2005 NHL Entry Draft.

Quick is a two-time Vezina Trophy nominee and William M. Jennings Trophy winner and was a silver medalist with the United States at the 2010 Winter Olympics. He won his first Stanley Cup championship with the Kings on June 11, 2012, and his second in 2014, again with the Kings. Quick's Conn Smythe Trophy-winning run in the 2012 Stanley Cup playoffs has been described as the best statistical playoff run ever.

Playing career

Amateur
As a youth, Quick played in the 2000 Quebec International Pee-Wee Hockey Tournament with the New York Rangers minor ice hockey team. He later played for the Mid Fairfield youth hockey association out of Darien Ice Rink. He carried his team to win a national championship and he was single time during his midget major year. His team also featured forwards Sean Backman, John Mori and Augie DiMarzo, Joey Sides, Joe DeBello, Chris Davis, Cam Atkinson who all went on to play professional hockey.

Quick played at Hamden High School in Hamden, Connecticut, before transferring to Avon Old Farms, where he was named to the 2002 New Haven Register All-Area Ice Hockey Team. Quick's number 32 Kings jersey is displayed in the Lou Astorino Ice Arena of Hamden. He led Avon Old Farms to two-straight New England Prep Championships in his junior and senior seasons. He had nine shutouts during his senior year.

Quick played collegiate hockey for the University of Massachusetts Amherst out of Hockey East (HE). As a freshman, he earned his first victory by a score of 4–2 on October 15, 2005, in his first start against Clarkson University. He also appeared in one playoff game as a freshman, which the Minutemen lost 4–1 to Boston University. Quick scored his first goal January 6, 2007, against Merrimack College. In the 4–2 win, the unassisted goal came during a delayed penalty into an empty net at 9:31 of the second period; it was the game-winning goal. While playing for the Minutemen, he led the team to their first-ever NCAA Men's Ice Hockey Championship appearance. In his first NCAA Tournament game, Quick shut-out Clarkson University, stopping all 33 shots he faced, in a 1–0 overtime victory. He appeared in five playoff games and posted a .944 save percentage.

Professional

Los Angeles Kings (2007–2023)
After losing in his first professional start, with the ECHL's Reading Royals, Quick made a statistically unlikely goal during a shutout in his second start, scoring an empty-net goal against the Pensacola Ice Pilots on October 27, 2007, at 19:25 in the third period.

Quick began the 2008–09 season with the Los Angeles Kings' American Hockey League (AHL) affiliate, the Manchester Monarchs, sharing time with Jonathan Bernier. He was called up to the Kings on December 16 after goaltender Erik Ersberg suffered a groin injury. Quick played his first NHL game on December 6, 2007, against the Buffalo Sabres in an 8–2 win. He earned his first career NHL shutout on December 23, 2008, defeating the Columbus Blue Jackets in Columbus. He also received the NHL's Third Star of the Week honor for the week ending December 28. In three games, Quick posted a 2–1–0 record, with both victories coming via shutout, posting a 0.67 goals against average (GAA) and a .958 save percentage. On February 9, 2009, he was awarded the First Star of the Week by the NHL after stopping 95 of 100 shots in a three-game road win streak, which launched the Kings back into the 2009 playoff picture. He finished the season with a 21–18–2 record, with a 2.48 GAA and .914 save percentage. He earned his first career NHL Stanley Cup playoff shutout on April 17, 2011, against the San Jose Sharks, stopping all 34 shots for a 4–0 shutout win.

On April 25, 2012, after the end of the 2011–12 regular season, Quick was nominated as a Vezina Trophy finalist, along with Henrik Lundqvist and Pekka Rinne, the former of which ultimately won the award. Quick was also named a 2011–12 NHL second team All-Star. He led the League with ten shutouts (a Kings franchise record), had the NHL's second-lowest GAA (1.95) and posted a 35–21–13 final record. Quick gained much attention during the 2012 Stanley Cup playoffs, as the eighth-seeded Kings defeated the top-seeded and Presidents' Trophy-winning Vancouver Canucks in five games, followed by the Kings' first-ever four-game playoff series sweep against the second-seeded St. Louis Blues.

On May 30, 2012, Quick set a new Stanley Cup playoff record after winning his 11th consecutive road game dating back to the 2011 postseason, surpassing the old mark of ten set by Billy Smith of the New York Islanders, and continued adding to the record. The streak ran from April 16, 2011, at San Jose to June 2, 2012, at New Jersey (12 games). Los Angeles qualified for the Western Conference Final for the second time in its 45-year history, and first time since the 1993 playoffs. The Kings ended its 19-year drought and made it to the Stanley Cup Finals after defeating the third-seeded Phoenix Coyotes in Game 5 of the Western Conference Final.

Quick was awarded the Conn Smythe Trophy following the Kings' first Stanley Cup victory over the New Jersey Devils, 6–1, taking the series four games to two. Quick posted a 16–4 record with a 1.41 GAA, a .946 save percentage and three shutouts along the way.

On June 28, 2012, Quick signed a ten-year contract extension that would last until the end of the 2022–23 season.

In November 2012, Quick joined the AHL's Manchester Monarchs to continue rehabilitation from an off-season back surgery. Quick won his second career Stanley Cup on June 13, 2014, after the Kings defeated the New York Rangers. He had two playoff shutouts, including one in Game 3 of the Finals, while also posting a save percentage of .911.

Following the 2013–14 season, Quick was awarded the William M. Jennings Trophy, which is presented annually "to the goalkeeper(s) having played a minimum of 25 games for the team with the fewest goals scored against it." Because Ben Scrivens and Martin Jones had not played the required number of games to qualify as co-recipients of the honor, Quick was named the sole winner of the trophy. Over the course of the season, Quick had compiled a 27–17–4 record with a 2.07 GAA, .915 save percentage and six shutouts in 49 appearances.

On October 16, 2014, Quick posted 43 saves on all 43 shots he faced in a 1–0 shootout victory over the St. Louis Blues. It was Quick's largest save percentage in a shootout win to date. On October 23, Quick surpassed Rogie Vachon as the Kings' all-time leader in shutouts by earning his 33rd after a 2–0 victory over the Buffalo Sabres.

In the 2014–15 season Quick would go on to play 72 games, starting 71 of them. Quick would finish with a record of 36–22–13, with a GAA of 2.24 and a Save Percentage of .918 and 6 shutouts. The Kings would go on to miss the playoffs, losing the last playoff spot to the Calgary Flames by 2 points. After the 5-0 shutout win against the Chicago Blackhawks on March 14, 2016, he is now the all-time leader in shutouts out of American born goaltenders.

On April 27, 2016, Jonathan was nominated for the Vezina Trophy, awarded to the league's best goalie, for the second time.

During the 2016–17 season, Quick suffered a lower-body injury in the season's first game on October 12, 2016 against the San Jose Sharks. He chose to not undergo surgery for the injury. Quick was out for four and a half months (59 games in all) and returned with the team on February 25, 2017 in win over the Anaheim Ducks 4–1.

Quick was invited to the 2018 NHL All-Star Game however he declined his invitation due to a nagging injury. Per NHL policy, any player who is invited, but declines, an All-Star invitation is required to sit out the next regular season game as a consequence. He was required by the league to sit out the following regular season game, which was on January 30, 2018. At the conclusion of the regular season, Quick was awarded his second Jennings Trophy for allowing the fewest goals against all season. With this, Quick helped the Kings qualify for the 2018 Stanley Cup playoffs, where they were subsequently swept by the Vegas Golden Knights in four games. Quick was however impressive, allowing only 7 goals over the four games, posting a 1.55 GAA and a .947 SV %.

On May 8, 2022, Quick recorded his tenth career playoff shutout in 4–0 victory over the Edmonton Oilers in the first round of the 2022 Stanley Cup playoffs, surpassing Mike Richter for first place among American goaltenders in that category.

Midway through the 2022–23 season, Quick's performance as the starting goaltender was being questioned. With Pheonix Copley taking over starting duties from Quick by the new year, a trade seemed inevitable. He started his last game as a King on February 26, 2023, a 5–2 loss against the New York Rangers.

Vegas Golden Knights (2023–present)
On March 1, 2023, Quick was traded to the Columbus Blue Jackets along with a conditional first-round pick in 2023 and third-round pick in 2024 in exchange for Vladislav Gavrikov and Joonas Korpisalo. One day later, however, Columbus traded Quick to the Vegas Golden Knights in exchange for Michael Hutchinson and a seventh-round pick in 2025.

Quick made his first start for Vegas, and his first non-Kings NHL start, on March 5, 2023, stopping 25 of 28 shots in a 4–3 victory over the Montreal Canadiens.

International play

On January 1, 2010, Quick was named to Team USA for the 2010 Winter Olympics in Vancouver as the team's third goaltender. He received a silver medal after the U.S. lost to Canada 3–2 in the gold medal game.

After his selection to Team USA for the 2014 Winter Olympics in Sochi, Head Coach Dan Bylsma named Quick the team's starting goaltender over teammates Ryan Miller and Jimmy Howard. He would go on to start five out of the U.S.' six games (Miller would start the other). However, the U.S. did not medal, as Quick finished the tournament with a 3–2 record, a 2.17 GAA and a .923 save percentage.

Personal life
Quick is married to Jaclyn (née Backman), and they have a daughter and son together. Jaclyn's sister Alicia is the wife of former Buffalo Sabres forward Matt Moulson.

Quick was born in Milford but raised in Hamden, Connecticut, and attended Hamden High School until transferring to Avon Old Farms, a preparatory school known for its hockey program. His family still resides in Hamden today. Ray and Mike's Deli in Hamden named the "Quickwich" sandwich in Quick's honor after his 2012 Stanley Cup victory.

Career statistics

Regular season and playoffs

International

Awards and honors

NHL Records
 Highest save percentage in a single playoff season, .946 (2011–12)

See also
List of NHL goaltenders with 300 wins

References

External links

 

1986 births
Living people
AHCA Division I men's ice hockey All-Americans
American men's ice hockey goaltenders
Avon Old Farms alumni
Conn Smythe Trophy winners
Ice hockey players at the 2010 Winter Olympics
Ice hockey players at the 2014 Winter Olympics
Ice hockey players from Connecticut
Los Angeles Kings draft picks
Los Angeles Kings players
Manchester Monarchs (AHL) players
Medalists at the 2010 Winter Olympics
National Hockey League All-Stars
Olympic silver medalists for the United States in ice hockey
People from Hamden, Connecticut
People from Milford, Connecticut
Reading Royals players
Sportspeople from New Haven County, Connecticut
Stanley Cup champions
UMass Minutemen ice hockey players
Vegas Golden Knights players
William M. Jennings Trophy winners